Slackers is a 2002 American comedy film directed by Dewey Nicks and starring Jason Schwartzman, Devon Sawa, Jason Segel, Michael Maronna, Jaime King, and Laura Prepon. Its plot follows a nerdy college student who blackmails a group of young men with his knowledge that they have cheated throughout college, and uses it to get closer to a young woman he is obsessed with.

Plot
Best friends Dave Goodman, Sam Schecter, and Jeff Davis have spent almost four years at Holden University scamming their way through college. During one exam scam in their final semester, Dave meets Angela Patton and asks her out while writing his phone number on her exam sheet. Ethan Dulles (who calls himself "Cool Ethan"), a nerdy student who is obsessed with Angela, observes Dave and grows jealous. Ethan takes her exam question sheet after Angela leaves and uses it to blackmail the guys into setting up a successful date with Angela for him. The guys set Ethan up in multiple situations in an attempt to convince Angela to like him, while Dave tells Sam during their work researching her that Angela is no more important to him as any other scam they have done.  Ethan fails to attract her after frequent confrontations based on his delusional behavior, immaturity and ignorance of social norms.

While trying to convince Angela to go out with Ethan, Dave and Angela grow a mutual attraction to each other. After telling Ethan that he has failed to convince Angela to go out with him, Ethan reveals to Dave that he has been obsessing over Angela for quite some time. He reminds Dave that he still intends to get Dave and his friends expelled if they fail him.  Angela and Dave go on an impromptu date after a study session. Ethan finds out and follows and records them. Dave and Angela share a romantic swim and lovemaking session, which Ethan records. He shows the tape of Dave and Angela making love to Sam and Jeff to establish that Dave intends to keep Angela for himself.  Sam and Jeff, unhappy with Dave's dishonesty, hand over their research on Angela. Ethan shows the file to Angela, telling her that Dave and his friends were actively stalking her. Dave punches Ethan in the face, but Ethan thinks he won Angela.

After a falling out with everyone, Dave returns to the dorm and admits to Sam and Jeff that he honestly cares for Angela.  After making amends, the guys sabotage Ethan's job interview with a law firm and, during the final exam, while Dave is telling the truth to Angela in front of the whole class about his entire dishonest college career of cheating, Jeff plants an answer key in Ethan's backpack while tipping off the teaching assistant proctoring the exam. The guys get expelled, but Dave and Angela get back together and Sam ends up in a relationship with Angela's roommate, Reanna Cass.  Jeff falsifies their diplomas from Holden University after Angela and Reanna graduate.  Ethan, miserable that he lost Angela forever and also expelled from college after it was revealed he was stalking her, continues to work his dead end restaurant job. The movie ends with him singing his love of Angela and his hatred for Dave.

Cast

Soundtrack
The film has a few tracks from Handsome Boy Modeling School (Prince Paul & Dan The Automator), including "Holy Calamity" and "Rock & Roll (Could Never Hip-Hop Like This)". It has a symphonic instrumental performance of "Baba O'Riley" from The Who playing over the opening credits, as well as an A Capella performance of "The Sign" by Ace of Base (sung by a college choir) during a scene.

Release and reception
As of June 2015, based on 105 reviews collected by the review aggregator website Rotten Tomatoes, Slackers has received an overall rating average of 10%, with an average score of 3.1 out of 10. The site's critical consensus reads:  "Another teen comedy with little on its mind but moving to the next gross-out gag, Slackers strains for laughs and features grating characters." On Metacritic, the film holds a 12/100 based on 28 critics, meaning “overwhelming dislike”. A few critics noted the dialogue as a positive, but not sufficiently good to warrant attention.

Slackers opened at #11 in the box office with $2,785,283, the 11th highest-grossing opening film of the weekend, and lasted only two weeks in theaters before it closed on February 14, 2002, with a domestic total of $5,285,941 and $1,127,974 internationally, for a worldwide total of $6,413,915.

Slackers was marketed as a raunchy comedy primarily, rather than as a romantic comedy, which was fair to the content; Philip French commented that "Slackers makes American Pie look like The Importance of Being Earnest."

Roger Ebert of The Chicago Sun-Times awarded the film a zero out of four stars and described the film as "a dirty movie. Not a sexy, erotic steamy or even smutty movie."

References

External links

 
 
 
 

2002 films
2002 romantic comedy films
Canadian sex comedy films
American romantic comedy films
American sex comedy films
American teen comedy films
2000s English-language films
English-language Canadian films
Films about pranks
Films set in California
Films shot in California
Films shot in Los Angeles
Screen Gems films
Original Film films
Alliance Atlantis films
2000s sex comedy films
2002 directorial debut films
Films set in universities and colleges
2000s American films
2000s Canadian films
English-language comedy films